Hákun West Av Teigum (born 19 February 2002) is a Faroese handball player for Skanderborg Aarhus Håndbold and the Faroese national team. In the summer of 2023 he's transferring to Füchse Berlin.

He participated at the 2022 European Men's Under-20 Championship.

References

2002 births
Living people
Faroese male handball players